Nowe Miasto nad Pilicą (translating to 'New City on the  Pilica') is a town in Grójec County, Masovian Voivodeship, Poland, with 4,022 inhabitants (2012).

Just to the west of town is a former military airfield.

See also
 Palace of Nowe Miasto nad Pilicą

References

External links
Official town webpage
Information about the nearby former military airfield on the pages of Poland's Military Surpulus Agency

Cities and towns in Masovian Voivodeship
Grójec County
Piotrków Governorate
Łódź Voivodeship (1919–1939)